Christopher Eric Roberts (born June 25, 1971) is an American former professional baseball pitcher. He played for the Chiba Lotte Marines of Nippon Professional Baseball (NPB) and for the United States national baseball team.

Career
Roberts attended Middleburg High School in Middleburg, Florida. He competed for the United States national baseball team in the 1989 World Junior Baseball Championships, winning gold. He also appeared in the 1991 Pan American Games, winning the bronze medal with the game-winning hit in the bronze medal game against the Dominican Republic national baseball team. In the tournament, he was named to the All-Tournament Team.

The Philadelphia Phillies selected Roberts in the second round of the 1989 Major League Baseball Draft, but he did not sign, opting to attend Florida State University, where he played college baseball for the Florida State Seminoles baseball team in the Atlantic Coast Conference of the National Collegiate Athletic Association's (NCAA) Division I. A two-way player at Florida State, Roberts was named a College Baseball All-American by Collegiate Baseball in 1992. That summer, he competed for the United States in the 1992 Summer Olympics.

The New York Mets drafted Roberts in the first round, with the 18th overall selection, of the 1992 Major League Baseball Draft. He played for the Chiba Lotte Marines of the Nippon Professional Baseball (NPB) in 2000. He retired after the 2001 season.

Since 2009, Roberts has served as assistant coach for the Stetson University baseball team, which competes in the Atlantic Sun Conference.

References

External links

1971 births
Living people
American expatriate baseball players in Canada
American expatriate baseball players in Japan
Baseball players at the 1991 Pan American Games
Baseball players at the 1992 Summer Olympics
Baseball coaches from Florida
Baseball players from Florida
Binghamton Mets players
Camden Riversharks players
Carolina Mudcats players
Chiba Lotte Marines players
Edmonton Trappers players
Florida State Seminoles baseball players
Gulf Coast Mets players
Indianapolis Indians players
Navegantes del Magallanes players
American expatriate baseball players in Venezuela
Newburgh Black Diamonds players
Nippon Professional Baseball pitchers
Norfolk Tides players
Olympic baseball players of the United States
Pan American Games bronze medalists for the United States
Pan American Games medalists in baseball
People from Green Cove Springs, Florida
St. Lucie Mets players
Medalists at the 1991 Pan American Games